The Xue family murder and abandonment case involves the murder by New Zealand man Nai Yin Xue (薛乃印, also known as Michael) of his wife Anan (Annie) Liu (劉安安), in Mt Roskill, Auckland, on 11 September 2007, and his subsequent abandonment of their three-year-old daughter, Qian Xun Xue (薛千寻 in Simplified Chinese) also known as Clare Xue and nicknamed "Pumpkin" by the police and media, at Southern Cross station in Melbourne, Australia. Nai Yin then fled to the United States, settling undercover across the southern states, before being captured by members of the ethnic Chinese community of Chamblee, Georgia and handed over to police. He was deported to New Zealand, and convicted of the murder of his wife in June 2009. He refused to confess to the murder until a parole hearing in 2020, when he finally expressed remorse.

The case attracted widespread media coverage in both Australia and New Zealand. It also gained attention in the United States after being featured in an episode of the television show America's Most Wanted. It was also documented by the Casefile True Crime Podcast.

Background 
Nai Yin Xue, a martial arts expert, was born in approximately 1953 or 1954, and had emigrated from China to New Zealand in 1980, age 25. His 28-year-old wife, Anan (Annie) Liu arrived in Auckland on 19 April 2002, to learn English. The couple lived at 26 Keystone Avenue, near Dominion Road in Mt Roskill, which was made up of two flats with a shared kitchen. The couple's marriage had been fairly happy until she had given birth to his daughter in 2004; Xue then became extremely aggressive and violent towards Liu for the baby being a girl.

Liu had been living in fear of her abusive husband since the child was born, having previously taken a protection order out against him after a particularly violent attack. On 28 July 2007, she had to flee with Qian Xun to a woman's refuge in Wellington after he threatened to murder her. They found her way to the Johnsonville home of a man named Weihong Song, who rented out rooms. It was ascertained that Song and Liu began to have feelings for each other, as his wife and daughter were away in China. When Xue found out about this, he purchased an axe to kill her and drove down to Wellington to do so. Xue broke into the home and began violently searching the rooms rented out. Song's dog sounded the alarm, and, with a rifle in his hand, Song chased Xue away. A speed camera in Levin at 3.31 am recorded Xue's drive back to Auckland.

Xue and Liu got back together shortly afterward for the sake of their child, but Xue continued to fear his wife was having an affair.

Initial case
On Tuesday, 11 September 2007, Liu was seen by her Keystone Avenue flatmates Zhengye Zhang and his wife Ling Liu in the kitchen. At 6.46pm she went to the nearby supermarket, and paid with Eftpos. That night, Zhang and Lhang Liu went out on one of their regular walks around Mt Roskill; they would testify that they left at 8pm, and were back between 10pm and 11pm. It was sometime during this time that  Nai Yin Xue murdered his wife Anan by strangling her with a necktie. Forensics indicated it took her three minutes to die. He then crudely left her body in the boot of their car, a 1993 Honda Rafaga in silver.

At 12.27 am on Wednesday, Xue visited a central Auckland ASB vault and checked his safety deposit box. At 2am, Police Constable Terrance Logan pulled him over on the southern motorway, and asked him where he was going. Xue lied, claiming he was going home when he was actually heading in the opposite direction. He then organised a flight to Melbourne with three-year-old Qian Xun, who was ignorant of the death of her mother.

Qian Xun Xue was abandoned near the base of an escalator at Melbourne's Southern Cross station on Saturday 15 September 2007 by her father, Nai Yin Xue, who boarded a flight to Los Angeles later that day. Originally unable to ascertain her real name, police in Melbourne nicknamed the child Pumpkin due to the Pumpkin Patch brand clothing she was wearing at the time. "Pumpkin" was soon placed in emergency foster care on 16 September.

On Monday 17 September, police learned the identities of the girl and her father, who had flown from Auckland two days prior to the abandonment. The girl's mother remained missing until her body was found on Wednesday 19 September in the boot of Xue's Honda Rafaga at their family home in the Auckland suburb of Mount Roskill.

Police handling

Victoria Police gave information about Xue to Interpol, the New Zealand and US police on 16 September. Once Ms Liu's body was found, an arrest warrant for Xue was issued by New Zealand Police on 20 September and sent to Interpol in the United States who were quick to issue a 'red notice' asking the Los Angeles Police Department to find the wanted man. However, the LAPD claimed they did not receive an arrest warrant from Interpol and that they required a warrant directly from New Zealand. New Zealand police were quick to refute the claim and did not require to send another to the LAPD. The Federal Bureau of Investigation also offered their help in finding Xue.

New Zealand police were criticised for "bungling" the investigation, including failure to discover Liu's body in the Honda for at least two days, and slow response to issue a warrant for the arrest of Xue, allowing him to disappear in the US.

The United States Marshals Service issued a wanted poster for Xue, describing him as 'armed and dangerous'. They recommended that if Xue was spotted, he should not be confronted. He was also on the highly viewed television show America's Most Wanted. Xue was subsequently seen in Houston, Texas, Biloxi, Mississippi, and Mobile, Alabama.

Arrest, trial and conviction
On Thursday 28 February 2008, a group of six people living in an apartment block in Chamblee, near Atlanta, Georgia recognised Xue from a photograph in the Chinese-language press. They attempted to inform the police but had difficulty in making themselves understood. In frustration, they captured him themselves. They removed his pants and tied them around his legs. They used his belt to tie his hands behind his back until police arrived to arrest him.

Xue initially attempted to provide a false name but he was identified from his New Zealand driver's licence. He had been on the run for 24 weeks. His overstay in the US without an appropriate visa meant that he was liable for deportation rather than extradition.

Xue was deported to New Zealand on 9 March 2008 to face murder charges over the death of his wife. His trial began on 2 June 2009. The prosecution presented evidence of ongoing violence and threats by Xue to his wife, while the defence argued that Liu had been unfaithful and died in a sexual misadventure. On 20 June, Xue was found guilty of Liu's murder. On 31 July, Xue was sentenced to life imprisonment with a minimum non-parole period of twelve years.

Custody
Custody of the child was sought by her maternal grandmother, Liu Xiao Ping, from China. The child also has a half sister, Grace Xue, who claims also to have been abandoned by their father at the age of 19, weeks after she arrived in a foreign country. The half sister, now 27, expressed an interest in caring for the child although they had never met.

Qian Xun returned to Auckland on 24 September 2007 where she was soon reunited with her grandmother. On 4 October 2007, the Family Court in New Zealand granted custody of Qian Xun to her grandmother, and visitation rights to her half sister, Grace Xue. Shortly after, Qian Xun returned to China with her grandmother on 6 October 2007.

A trust fund for public donations, set up by Grace Xue, raised $NZ40,000 but the money was rejected by Qian Xun's grandmother. The money is now likely to be held in trust for Qian Xun's future use.

References

2007 in Australia
2008 in Georgia (U.S. state)
Criminal investigation
Uxoricides
2008 crimes in the United States
2009 in New Zealand law
Murder in New Zealand
Child abandonment
2007 murders in New Zealand